Branimir Rančić is a medical doctor and politician in Serbia. He has served in the National Assembly of Serbia since 2015 as a member of the Serbian Progressive Party.

Early life and career
Rančić is a doctor of neuropsychiatry working in Gadžin Han. He lives in Niš.

Political career
Rančić received the 172nd position on the Progressive Party's Aleksandar Vučić — Future We Believe In electoral list for the 2014 Serbian parliamentary election. The list won a landslide victory with 158 out of 250 mandates; Rančić was not initially re-elected but received a mandate on January 27, 2015, as a replacement for Vladeta Kostić, who had resigned. He was promoted to the thirty-eighth position in the 2016 parliamentary election and was elected when the list won a second consecutive majority with 131 seats.

Rančić is the deputy chair of the assembly committee on labour, social issues, social inclusion, and poverty reduction; a deputy member of the health and family committee; the deputy chair of a working group on the political empowerment of persons with disabilities; and a member of the parliamentary friendship groups with Belarus, Bosnia and Herzegovina, Bulgaria, Italy, Kazakhstan, Switzerland, and the United States of America.

References

1953 births
Living people
Politicians from Niš
Members of the National Assembly (Serbia)
Serbian Progressive Party politicians
Serbian psychiatrists